Cedar Hill Cemetery, also known as Green Hill Cemetery, is a historic cemetery and national historic district located at Suffolk, Virginia. The district encompasses four contributing structures, one contributing site, and three contributing objects in the a city-owned, 25-acre, public cemetery dating to 1802.  Grave markers within the cemetery date from the early 19th century to the present day. This cemetery is a representative example of public cemetery planning and funerary artwork found in southeast Virginia and Suffolk.  The contributing structures include the Darden (1938), Hosier, Hill (1933) and Brewer-Godwin mausoleums and the contributing objects include the Confederate Monument (1889) and World War I Monument.

It was added to the National Register of Historic Places in 2006.

Notable burials
 Lawrence O'Bryan Branch (1820–1862), Civil War Confederate Brigadier General
 William Henry Haywood Jr. (1801–1852), US Senator
 Richard Hines (1792–1851), US Congressman
 Charles Manly (1795–1871). North Carolina Governor
 Sion Hart Rogers (1825–1874), US Congressman
 Absalom Tatom (1742–1802), US Congressman

References

External links
 City of Suffolk Cemetery Brochure
 

Historic districts on the National Register of Historic Places in Virginia
Cemeteries on the National Register of Historic Places in Virginia
Buildings and structures in Suffolk, Virginia
National Register of Historic Places in Suffolk, Virginia
Confederate States of America monuments and memorials in Virginia